Ferrand Martinez (fl. 14th century) was a Spanish cleric and archdeacon of Écija, most noted for being an antisemitic agitator whom historians cite as the prime mover behind the series of pogroms against the Spanish Jews in 1391, beginning in the city of Seville.

Little is known of Martínez's early life. Before taking up the position at Écija, he was the confessor of the queen mother of Aragón. Beginning in 1378, he began preaching sermons against the Jews. Although Juan I commanded him to cease his rabble-rousing, he ignored the royal order, as well as commands from Barroso, archbishop of Toledo, the primate of Spain.  For more than a decade Martínez continued his verbal assaults, telling Catholics to "expel the Jews...and to demolish their synagogues." Though put on trial in 1388, his activities were not checked by the king, though the latter stated that the Jews must not be maltreated. 

The tipping point occurred when both Juan I and Barroso died in 1390, leaving his 11-year-old son Henry III to rule under the regency of his mother. Martínez continued his campaign against the Jews of Seville, calling on clergy and people to destroy synagogues and seize Jewish holy books and other items. These events led to a further royal order deposing Martínez from his office and ordering damaged synagogues be repaired at Church expense. Declaring that neither the state nor the local church authorities had power over him, he ignored the commands.

The first anti-Jewish riots began in Seville in March 1391. It was on 6 June that the first great massacre occurred. Thousands of Jews were murdered, and many were forced to accept baptism. Over the course of the year, the massacres would spread to all of Spain. These events inaugurated the beginning of the mass conversions, as fear gripped the Jewish communities of Spain.  

Martínez was imprisoned again by royal order in 1395, and although he was quickly released, he died soon after, leaving his fortune to a hospital he had founded at San María, Seville.

References

Further reading

External links 
 The Jewish Encyclopedia 
Selections in English and Spanish of Ferrán Martínez’s speech at the Tribunal del Alcázar in Seville, 19 February, 1388 (pedagogical edition) with introduction, notes, and bibliography in Open Iberia/América (open access teaching anthology)

14th-century births
Year of death missing
Archdeacons